The Adirondack Frostbite were a minor professional ice hockey team based in Glens Falls, New York, and were a member of the United Hockey League (UHL). They played their home games at the Glens Falls Civic Center.

The Adirondack IceHawks UHL team came to Glens Falls in 2000, one season after the American Hockey League's (AHL) Adirondack Red Wings disbanded. The IceHawks were a relocation of the Winston-Salem IceHawks from Winston-Salem, North Carolina. In 2004, ESPN SportsCenter anchor Steve Levy and NHL analyst Barry Melrose became the team's owners and the team changed its name to the Frostbite.

On January 13, 2006, head coach Marc Potvin was found dead in his hotel room in Kalamazoo, Michigan, hours before his team was to play the Kalamazoo Wings.

The Frostbite suspended operations on June 12, 2006, after the team could not come to a lease agreement with the Glens Falls Civic Center. Professional hockey would not return to the Adirondack region until 2009 when the AHL's Philadelphia Phantoms relocated to become the Adirondack Phantoms.

References

External links 

Adirondack Frostbite on HockeyDB

Defunct United Hockey League teams
Ice hockey teams in New York (state)
Defunct ice hockey teams in the United States
2000 establishments in New York (state)
2006 disestablishments in New York (state)
Defunct sports teams in New York (state)
Sports in Glens Falls, New York
Ice hockey clubs established in 2000
Ice hockey clubs disestablished in 2006
Tampa Bay Lightning minor league affiliates